Wanderer was a German manufacturer of bicycles, motorcycles, automobiles, vans and other machinery. Established as Winklhofer & Jaenicke in 1896 by Johann Baptist Winklhofer and Richard Adolf Jaenicke, the company used the Wanderer brand name from 1911, making  civilian automobiles until 1941 and military vehicles until 1945. Today the brand is part of the Zweirad Einkaufs Genossenschaft (ZEG).

History

Winklhofer & Jaenicke was established in 1896 in Chemnitz. It built motorcycles from 1902 and automobiles from 1903. The Wanderer brand was chosen in 1911 for overseas exports and was soon adopted for domestic sales.

The first two- or three-seater models used four-cylinder 1145 cc and 1220 cc engines. The 1220 cc model lasted until 1925. The first six-cylinder model appeared in 1928. By 1926, when Wanderer introduced a successful Typ 10, the company was making 25 vehicles a day; parts were made at the old plant in Chemnitz and assembled at the 1927 built new site in Siegmar, delivered by rail right to the assembly line. Motorcycle production continued in Chemnitz alone.

During the Great Depression, in 1929, the company owner, Dresdner Bank, sold the motorcycle business to František Janeček, and in 1932 divested the rest of Wanderer. The car division with its Siegmar factory became part of Auto Union together with Horch, Audi and DKW. In this quartet, Horch was positioned as the luxury brand, DKW and Slaby-Beringer built cheap two-stroke cars, and Audi and Wanderer competed in the Middle class and Upper Middle class	segments the same way GM's Buick and Oldsmobile divisions were used, technologically advanced small cars (the heaviest, 6-cylinder Wanderers reached 1.5 tons dry weight). Wanderers of the Nazi period acquired a trademark radiator design, shaped as a heraldic shield.

The next model W17 7/35 PS was propelled by a new 1692 cc OHV four-cylinder engine developed by Ferdinand Porsche. In 1933 the new Audi Front was equipped with the Wanderer W22 engine, a 1950 cc OHV six-cylinder, also a Porsche design. The top model from 1936 to 1939 was the W50, propelled by a 2257 cc six-cylinder engine. From 1937 on there were also sporting fours (W24 and W25) and another six-cylinder model of 2632 cc (W23), propelled by new Flathead engines constructed by Auto Union itself. Wanderer cars were always admired for their high quality and sporting character. 

During World War II, all civilian production was replaced in 1941 with licence-built military vehicles, such as Steyr 1500A light truck. A subcamp of Flossenbürg concentration camp, KZ Siegmar-Schonau, was operated during the war to provide slave labour for the Wanderer vehicle plants. From 1943 on the Auto Union Siegmar plant produced Maybach HL230 V12 engines, used in many heavy tanks of the German Wehrmacht.

The Wanderer Siegmar plant (now Chemnitz) of Auto Union was destroyed in early 1945, closing this chapter in the history of automobiles. Post-war efforts to restore East German auto industry concentrated on Auto Union facilities in Zwickau and Zschopau: Wanderer car production never recovered, with Auto Union relocating to Ingolstadt, West Germany, where the company was rebuilt based using the DKW and, ultimately, the Audi brand.

Automobile models

See also
 List of automobile manufacturers
 List of German cars
 Auto Union

References

External links 

 Dates in the history of Wanderer - Audi USA
 AUTO UNION Sales Brochures 1939
 

Defunct motorcycle manufacturers of Germany
Defunct motor vehicle manufacturers of Germany
Vehicle manufacturing companies established in 1896
Vehicle manufacturing companies disestablished in 1945
1896 establishments in Germany
1945 disestablishments in Germany
Auto Union